This is a list of Kazakh football transfers during the 2022 winter transfer window.

Kazakhstan Premier League 2023

Aksu

In:

Out:

Aktobe

In:

Out:

Astana

In:

Out:

Atyrau

In:

Out:

Caspiy

In:

Out:

Kairat

In:

Out:

Kaisar

In:

Out:

Kyzylzhar

In:

Out:

Maktaaral

In:

Out:

Okzhetpes

In:

Out:

Ordabasy

In:

Out:

Shakhter Karagandy

In:

Out:

Tobol

In:

Out:

Zhetysu

In:

Out:

References

Kazakhstan
2022-23
Transfers